Hugo Mark Gerbermann, M.M. (September 11, 1913 - October 19, 1996) was an American-born Catholic missionary and bishop. As a member of the Catholic Foreign Mission Society of America (Maryknoll) he was assigned to missions in Ecuador and Guatemala. He served as the Prelate of the Territorial Prelature of Huehuetenango in Guatemala before becoming the first bishop of the Diocese of Huehuetenango from 1967 to 1975. He then served as an Auxiliary Bishop of the Archdiocese of San Antonio in the United States from 1975 to 1982.

Early life and education
Hugo Gerbermann was born in Nada, Texas to John J. and Matilda H. Gerbermann and was one of eight children.  He was educated in the local public schools before attending St. John's Seminary in San Antonio for the Archdiocese of San Antonio.  He completed his novitiate at Bedford, Massachusetts and his studies for the priesthood in New York before being ordained a priest for Maryknoll on February 7, 1943.

Priesthood
Gerbermann was sent to the new Maryknoll Misson in Ecuador where he served for five years until the community was replaced by Spanish Franciscans.  He was sent to Guatemala where he spent 27 years.  He held pastoral as well leadership position in the Maryknoll Mission.  While in Guatemala he was forced into exile after the Communists took over the government there.  He snuck back into the country to continue his work and lived among the native peoples in primitive conditions.  Pope John XXIII named him as the Prelate of Huehuetenango on August 8, 1961.

Episcopacy
Gerbermann was appointed the Titular Bishop of Amathus in Palaestina on June 6, 1962 and he was consecrated by Archbishop Ambrogio Marchioni, the Apostolic Nuncio to El Salvador and Guatemala, on July 22, 1962.  The principal co-consecrators were Archbishop Mariano Rossell y Arellano, the Prelate of Esquipulas, and Bishop Celestino Miguel Fernández Pérez, O.F.M. of San Marcos.  Gerbermann attended three of the four sessions of the Second Vatican Council (1962-1965).  On December 23, 1967 Pope Paul VI appointed him the first bishop of the Diocese of Huehuetenango.  His health started to decline and an auxiliary bishop was assigned to Huehuetenango to assist Gerbermann in his ministry.  He remained as the diocesan bishop until is resignation was accepted by Pope Paul on July 22, 1975.  On that same day he was appointed the Titular Bishop of Pinhel and Auxiliary Bishop of San Antonio.  Gerberman lived at St. Agnes Parish in Edna, Texas and served as vicar general of the archdiocese.  He served the archdiocese as an auxiliary bishop until Pope John Paul II accepted his resignation on June 30, 1982.

Later life and death
In his retirement he resided at St. Mary’s Parish in his native Nada and assisted local priests with their pastoral responsibilities.  He later moved into the Czech Catholic Home in Hillje, Texas where he died on October 19, 1996 at the age of 83.  His funeral was held at The Church of the Nativity of the Blessed Virgin Mary and he was laid to rest at St. Mary’s Cemetery in Nada.

See also

References

1913 births
1996 deaths
People from Colorado County, Texas
American Roman Catholic missionaries
American people of German descent
Roman Catholic missionaries in Ecuador
Roman Catholic missionaries in Guatemala
20th-century Roman Catholic bishops in Guatemala
20th-century American Roman Catholic titular bishops
Maryknoll Seminary alumni
Maryknoll bishops
Participants in the Second Vatican Council
American expatriates in Guatemala
American expatriates in Ecuador
Catholics from Texas
Roman Catholic bishops of Huehuetenango